The 2023 Sun Belt Conference football season will be the 23rd season of college football play for the Sun Belt Conference (SBC). The season is scheduled to begin on August 31, 2023, and conclude with its conference championship game on December 2, 2023. It is part of the 2023 NCAA Division I FBS football season. The conference will consist of 14 member schools split into two divisions. The conference released its full season schedule on February 24, 2023.

Previous season

During the 2022 Sun Belt Conference football season, Coastal Carolina won the east division, while Troy won the west division. In the conference championship game, Troy defeated Coastal Carolina by a score of 45–26. Troy advanced to the Cure Bowl where they defeated UTSA. Coastal Carolina advanced to the Birmingham Bowl, where they lost to East Carolina.

Head Coaches
On November 27, 2022, Texas State announced that they had fired head coach Jake Spavital. Spavital had posted a record of 13–35 over four years at the school. On December 7, 2022, Texas State announced Incarnate Word's head coach G. J. Kinne would take over as the new head coach for the 2023 season.
On December 4, 2022, Jamey Chadwell announced that he was leaving Coastal Carolina to take over the head coaching position at Liberty. Later on December 4, Coastal Carolina announced NC State offensive coordinator Tim Beck as the new head coach beginning in 2023.

Rankings

Schedule
The 2023 schedule was released on February 24, 2023.

Week 1

Week 2

Week 3

Week 4

Week 5

Week 6

Week 7

Week 8

Week 9

Week 10

Week 11

Week 12

Week 13

Championship Game

Sun Belt records vs other conferences

2023–2024 records against non-conference foes:

Sun Belt vs Power 5 matchups
This is a list of games the Sun Belt has scheduled versus power conference teams (ACC, Big 10, Big 12, Pac-12, Notre Dame and SEC). All rankings are from the current AP Poll at the time of the game.

Sun Belt vs Group of Five matchups
The following games include Sun Belt teams competing against teams from the American, C-USA, MAC, or Mountain West.

Sun Belt vs FBS independents matchups
The following games include Sun Belt teams competing against FBS Independents, which includes Army, UConn, or UMass.

Sun Belt vs FCS matchups

Awards and honors

Player of the week honors

References